Pseudocrossocheilus nigrovittatus is a species of cyprinid fish endemic to China. They live in on the bottom of fast flowing rivers and reach a maximum length of 9.7 cm.

Distribution
China

References

Fish described in 2003
Pseudocrossocheilus